Olga Kozhevnikova (born 28 August 1980) is a Kazakhstani gymnast. She competed at the 1996 Summer Olympics.

References

External links
 

1980 births
Living people
Kazakhstani female artistic gymnasts
Olympic gymnasts of Kazakhstan
Gymnasts at the 1996 Summer Olympics
Sportspeople from Almaty
Asian Games medalists in gymnastics
Gymnasts at the 1998 Asian Games
Gymnasts at the 2002 Asian Games
Asian Games bronze medalists for Kazakhstan
Medalists at the 1998 Asian Games
20th-century Kazakhstani women